Karsu Dönmez (born 19 April 1990) is a Turkish-Dutch singer from Amsterdam. While her music style is a blend of various genres, jazz pop is probably the best description for it. At age 7 her parents bought a piano with money they had put aside for buying a car. At 14 she was making a name for herself by performing at her parents' restaurant. She came to prominence after performances at the Carnegie Hall in New York and several appearances on Dutch television.

In 2010 Karsu's first album Live aan 't IJ was released. In October 2012, her first studio album, Confession, followed, and was received positively by the press. On Colors from 2015 her compositions are more playful and cheerful than her previous work. The title of the album refers to Karsu's bicultural background with roots in Turkey and Amsterdam. In 2016 the Edison Foundation gave her the Edison Award for Colors. She built a music school for refugees in Athens, Greece. She also took role as a director, for helping refugees in Amsterdam. Her life was documented by director Mercedes Stalenhoef and follows Karsu as she climbs the ladder from the restaurant to the stage of Carnegie Hall, and further into the music world.

Discography

Studio albums

Live albums

Singles
 "Raise Our Hands" (2014)
 "Jest Oldu" (2018)
 "Paint It Black" (2018)
 "A Change Is Gonna Come" (2018)
 "Esmerim Biçim Biçim" (2018)
 "Itiraf" (2019)
 "Sana Ne" (2019)
 "Ben Yanındayım" (feat. Çağrı Sinci) (2019)
 "Sonunda" (2021)

References 

Musicians from Amsterdam
Dutch people of Turkish descent
Dutch singer-songwriters
1990 births
Living people
21st-century Dutch singers
21st-century Dutch women singers